Solyony is a rural locality (a khutor) in Petrovsky Selsoviet, Ishimbaysky District, Bashkortostan, Russia. The population was 1 as of 2010. There are 3 streets.

Geography 
Solyony is located 24 km northeast of Ishimbay (the district's administrative centre) by road. Timashevka is the nearest rural locality.

References 

Rural localities in Ishimbaysky District